Moody Independent School District is a public school district based in Moody, Texas (USA).

Located in McLennan County, the district extends into portions of Coryell and Bell counties.

In 2009, the school district was rated "academically acceptable" by the Texas Education Agency.

Schools
Moody High School (Grades 9-12)
Moody Middle School (Grades 5–8)
Moody Elementary School (Grades PK-4)

References

External links
Moody ISD

School districts in McLennan County, Texas
School districts in Bell County, Texas
School districts in Coryell County, Texas